The Scurlock Foundation is a charitable organization located in Houston, Texas, with the goal to provide funding for medical research, health care, religion, education, recreation, the arts, and animal protection, as well as other charitable enterprises.

The foundation was established and chartered in April 1954 by Eddy C. Scurlock, a Houston oil industry tycoon, and his wife, Elizabeth. Other founding members were their daughter, Laura L. Scurlock Blanton, and son-in-law, Jack S. Blanton, who became president of Scurlock Oil Company in 1958.

In 1992, the Scurlock Foundation reported assets of over $9 million and an income of over $750,000. There were 122 grants made for a total of $604,720, mostly to art museums and art associations.

In 2015, the foundation provided support for an exhibition showcasing a medieval illuminated manuscript and related artifacts at the Blanton Museum of Art at The University of Texas at Austin.

References

External links

Foundations based in the United States
Organizations established in 1954
Companies based in Houston
1954 establishments in Texas